The European serin, or simply the serin (Serinus serinus), is the smallest species of the family of finches (Fringillidae) and is closely related to the Atlantic canary. Its diet consists mainly of a combination of buds and seeds.

Taxonomy
The European serin was described by Carl Linnaeus in 1766 in the 12th edition of his Systema Naturae under the binomial name Fringilla serinus. The Latin serinus comes from the French word serin for a canary. The French word may be a corruption of the Latin word citrinus meaning "lemon-coloured".

Description
The European serin is a small short-tailed bird, 11–12 cm in length. The upper parts are dark-streaked greyish green, with a yellow rump. The yellow breast and white belly are also heavily streaked.  The male has a brighter yellow face and breast, yellow wing bars and yellow tail sides. The song of this bird is a buzzing trill, very familiar in Mediterranean countries.

It breeds across southern and central Europe and North Africa. Southern and Atlantic coast populations are largely resident, but the northern breeders migrate further south in Europe for the winter. Open woodland and cultivation, often with some conifers, is favoured for breeding. It builds its nest in a shrub or tree, laying 3–5 eggs. It forms flocks outside the breeding season, sometimes mixed with other finches.

The food is mainly seeds, and, in the breeding season, insects. This small serin is an active and often conspicuous bird.

References

External links

Audio recordings from Xeno-canto
 European Serin videos, photos & sounds on the Internet Bird Collection
 Ageing and sexing by Javier Blasco-Zumeta & Gerd-Michael Heinze
 Oiseaux Photographs, text, map.

European serin
Birds of Europe
European serin
European serin
Articles containing video clips